The Order of Merit of Saxony-Anhalt is the highest award of the German State of Saxony-Anhalt.  Established 23 May 2006, the order is presented by the Minister-President of Saxony-Anhalt.  The total number of living recipients is limited to 300.  Recipients of the order are recognized for exceptional performance over a longer period of time or an extraordinary individual performance for Saxony-Anhalt and its citizens.  Individuals are considered from among the citizens and non-citizens of Saxony-Anhalt.

Insignia
The badge of the Order of Merit of Saxony-Anhalt is a Maltese cross enameled in white with a black and gold border.  In the center of the cross is a gold medallion bearing the Coat of arms of Saxony-Anhalt.  Men wear the badge of the order around the neck under the collar of the dress shirt.  Women wear the badge  from a bow of the ribbon about a hand's breadth below the left shoulder.  The ribbon of the order is half yellow and half black with gold edges.

Notable recipients
Henning Scheich 
Hans-Dietrich Genscher
Neo Rauch
Heribert Beissel
Edda Moser
Friedrich Schorlemmer
Wolfgang Böhmer
Johannes Ludewig 
Leo Nowak, bishop
Michael Schönheit 
Siegfried Pank
Friede Springer

References

Saxony-Anhalt
Saxony-Anhalt
Culture of Saxony-Anhalt